Sear may refer to:

People
 Cliff Sear (1936–2000), a Welsh footballer
 Helen Sear (born 1955), a Welsh photographic artist 
 Morey Leonard Sear (1929–2004), a United States federal judge
 Tammy Sear (born 1977), a British former competitive figure skater
 Walter Sear (1930–2010), an American recording engineer and musician

Places
 Sahar Elevated Access Road, an elevated express access road in Mumbai, India

Other uses
 Sear (firearm), part of the trigger mechanism on a firearm
 Sear, to cook by searing, a cooking technique which quickly cooks the exterior of a food item
 Sear, a client for the WorldForge MMORPG framework
 Seir (demon), a Prince of Hell; also spelled Sear
 SEAr, the Hughes–Ingold symbol for the electrophilic aromatic substitution reaction
antiquated, turn of the century Scandinavian men's first name. Pronounced "Say-er"

See also
 Cere, part of the beak of some birds
 Sears (disambiguation)
 Seer (disambiguation)
 Seir (disambiguation)
 Sere (disambiguation)